Hans Eugen Frischknecht (born 8 May 1939) is a Swiss composer, organist, choral conductor and harpsichordist.

Life 
Born in St. Gallen, Frischknecht graduated from the Swiss Music Pedagogic Association after his school-leaving exams as a piano teacher (SMPV). From 1959 to 1962, he studied composition with Boris Blacher, counterpoint with Ernst Pepping, organ (final examination) with Michael Schneider and twelve-tone music with Josef Rufer at the Universität der Künste Berlin. in der MusicSack-Datenbank From 1962 to 1964 he continued his training with Olivier Messiaen (courses in analysis), in organ with Gaston Litaize and in harpsichord with Robert Veyron-Lacroix at the Conservatoire de Paris. Until 1969, he studied music theory (teaching diploma) with Theo Hirsbrunner and Jörg Ewald Dähler at the Hochschule der Künste Bern.

As organist and harpsichordist, he gave concerts in Europe and the USA. From 1964 to 2002, he was organist and choirmaster at the Protestant-Reformed Johanneskirche in the Breitenrain quarter of Bern. In 1970, he founded and took over the direction of the International Society for Contemporary Music Vocal Soloists Bern. In 1980, he conducted the world premiere of the Madrigal by Manfred Trojahn. From 1983 to 2003, he taught improvisation and theory at the Hochschule der Künste Bern in Biel.

Frischknecht was President of the Bern City Association of the International Society for New Music (IGNM) from 1977 to 1988. He served as President of the local Swiss Music Pedagogical Association (SMPV) in Bern from 1978 to 1990. He was also for many years president of the SMPV.

In addition to organ, piano and harpsichord pieces, he composed mainly chamber music and choral works.

Frischknecht is married to the organist Eliane Kneuss and lives in Muri near Bern.

Awards 
 1964: Premier Prix of the Classe d’Analyse at the Conservatoire de Paris
 1971: First prize at the St Albans International Organ Festival in England

Recordings 
 Orgelwerke (Pro, 1992)
 Musik für meine Freunde (Classic, 1995)
 Festival l’art pour l’Aar 2003 (Müller & Schade, 2005)
 Festival l’art pour l’Aar 2005 (Müller & Schade, 2006)

Publications 
 Rhythmen und Dauerwerte im Livre d’Orgue von Olivier Messiaen. In Musik und Gottesdienst 22 (1968) 1, .
 Kirchenmusik auf falschem Weg. In Musik und Gottesdienst 22 (1968) 1.
 Jugend und Avantgarde. In Schweizerische Musikzeitung 116 (1976) 4, .
 Die geistliche Musik von Olivier Messiaen. In Musik und Gottesdienst 32 (1978) 6, .
 Vergleichende Musiktheorie. In Schweizerische Musikzeitung 119 (1979) 5, .
 Wie laut soll eine Orgel sein. In Musik und Gottesdienst 34 (1980) 5. .
 Komponist – Elfenbeinturm – Laie. In Neue Musik für Jugendliche und Laien (1980), .
 Sätze zu Chorälen des Kirchengesangsbuches. In Musik und Gottesdienst 43 (1989) 3. .
 Geistliche Musik und Orgelmusik der letzten Jahre. In Musik und Gottesdienst 44 (1990) 5. .
 Zum Gedenken an Olivier Messiaen. In Musik und Gottesdienst 46 (1992), .
 Abriss der Musikgeschichte seit 1945. Ein Leitfaden für Musikstudierende. In Schweizer Musikpädagogische Blätter 85 (1997) 2, . (Digitalisiert; PDF; 157 kB)
 Die Rosinen aus den Kantionalsätzen herausgenommen. In Musik und Gottesdienst 55 (2001) 3,.
 Von der römischen Windlade zur Viertelton-Orgel. Streifzüge durch den schweizerischen Orgelbau. In Musik & Kirche 74 (2004), 1, .
 Ein oder mehrere Achtflüsse? In Musik und Gottesdienst 62 (2008) 1, .
 Potential und Grenzen einer musikalischen Sprache. Olivier Messiaens « Modes à transpositions limitées » unter der Lupe. In Dissonanz 104 (2008), .

Further reading
 Frischknecht, Hans Eugen. In Paul Frank, Wilhelm Altmann: Kurzgefaßtes Tonkünstlerlexikon. Second part: Ergänzungen und Erweiterungen seit 1937. Vol. 1, Heinrichshofen, 15th edition, Wilhelmshaven 1974, .
 Hans Eugen Frischknecht. In Lucerne Festival (ed.): Vom alphornruf zum synthesizerklang. Schweizer Musik aus 150 Jahren Rathaus der Stadt Luzern (Kornschutte). 17. August – 11. September 1991. Walter Labhart, Endingen 1991, .
 Hans Eugen Frischknecht. In Hans Steinbeck, Walter Labhart (ed.): Schweizer Komponisten unserer Zeit. Biographien, Werkverzeichnisse mit Discographie und Bibliographie. Amadeus, Winterthur 1993, .
 Frischknecht, Hans Eugen. In David M. Cummings (ed.): International Who’s who in Music and Musicians’ Directory. 14th edition, Melrose Press, Cambridge 1994, .
 Theo Hirsbrunner: Improvisationen, notiert. Der Komponist Hans Eugen Frischknecht. In Dissonanz. 63 (1998), .
 Hans Eugen Frischknecht. In Daniela Philippi: Neue Orgelmusik. Werke und Kompositionstechniken von der Avantgarde bis zur pluralistischen Moderne. Bärenreiter, Kassel 2002,  .
 Frischknecht, Hans Eugen. In Peter Hollfelder: Klaviermusik. Internationales chronologisches Lexikon. Geschichte. Komponisten. Werke. Supplement, Noetzel, Wilhelmshaven 2005, .
 Frischknecht, Hans Eugen. In Axel Schniederjürgen (ed.): Kürschners Musiker-Handbuch. 5th edition, Saur Verlag, Munich 2006, .
 Stephan Thomas: Die Aare und die Neue Musik. In the Schweizer Musikzeitung 10 (2007) 12, . (Interview)
 Theo Hirsbrunner: Hans Eugen Frischknecht. Improvisationen, notiert. In Au carrefour des mondes, édition dissonance. 1 (2008), .
 Bruno Spoerri: Hans Eugen Frischknecht. In Bruno Spoerri (ed.): Musik aus dem Nichts. Die Geschichte der elektroakustischen Musik in der Schweiz. Chronos, Zürich 2010, .

References

External links 
 
 
 Literatur von Hans Eugen Frischknecht in the Bibliography of Music Literature

20th-century classical composers
20th-century hymnwriters
Classical organists
Choral conductors
Swiss harpsichordists
Conservatoire de Paris alumni
1939 births
Living people
People from the canton of St. Gallen
20th-century Swiss composers